The discography of Japanese rock band The Brilliant Green consists of five studio albums, compilation album and 20 singles. These were released through Sony Music Records from 1997 until mid 2000, when the band moved to Sony sub-label Defstar Records. The Brilliant Green parted with Sony in 2008 after releasing the compilation album Complete Single Collection '97–'08, and began releasing music through Warner Music Japan from 2010 onwards.

Albums

Studio albums

Compilation albums

Singles

Promotional singles

Video albums

Notes

References

Discographies of Japanese artists
Pop music group discographies
Rock music group discographies